Vlad Cubreacov (born 24 September 1965, in Crihana Veche, Cahul district) is a Moldovan politician.

Biography 

In 1989 he graduated from the journalism faculty of the State University of Moldova. He worked as a scientific consultant at the Dimitrie Cantemir Literature Museum in Chişinău (1989–1991), then becoming head of the Department of Religious Affairs in the Ministry of Culture and Religious Affairs (1991–1994). Since 1994 he has been a deputy in the Parliament of the Republic of Moldova, and since 1996 he has been a member of the Parliamentary Assembly of the Council of Europe (Committee on Culture, Science and Education). He represents the Metropolitan Church of Bessarabia at the European Court of Human Rights. Since 1999 he has served as vice-president of the Christian-Democratic People's Party (PPCD), and since April 2005 he has also been the leader of the Christian-democrat parliamentary group in the Parliament of the Republic of Moldova. He has been decorated with the Cross of the Patriarchate of Romania for laymen, the Cross of the Brotherhood of the Holy Grave of the Russian Federation, and the Distinction of merit of the Metropolitanate of Moldova and Bucovina.

Cubreacov is married.

External links
 Adunarea Parlamentară a Consiliului Europei - Vlad Cubreacov
Situation des élèves roumains dans les territoires moldaves occupés
Situation of Romanian pupils in the occupied Moldovan territories
Complicité de la Patriarchie de Moscou et de toute la Russie avec le régime illégale et sécessioniste installé à l'Est de la République de Moldova
Complicity of the Patriarch of Moscow and all Russia with the illegal and secessionist regime installed in the east of the Moldovan Republic
Liberté de la Métropolie de la Béssarabie
Freedom of the Metropolis of Bessarabia
DECLARATION ECRITE N° 265 concernant l'arrêt de la Cour d'Appel de la République de Moldova relatif à la légitimité et à la liberté de la Métropolie de Bessarabie
WRITTEN DECLARATION No. 265 on the decision of the Court of Appeal of the Republic of Moldova on the legitimacy and freedom of the Metropolis of Bessarabia
Droit de l'Eglise métropolitaine de Bessarabie à sa propre succession juridique
Right of the Metropolitan Church of Bessarabia to its own succession in title
Respect des droits des Roumains de Timok (Serbie orientale)
Respect for the rights of the Timok Romanians (Eastern Serbia)
Violation des droits de l’homme de la minorité nationale roumaine en Serbie
Violation of the human rights of the Romanian ethnic minority in Serbia
Difficult cultural situation of the Istro-Romanian minority particularly threatened
La situation culturelle difficile de la minorité istro-roumaine particulièrement menacée

Living people
1965 births
People from Cahul District
Moldovan MPs 1994–1998
Moldovan MPs 2005–2009
Moldovan journalists
Male journalists
Popular Front of Moldova politicians
Moldova State University alumni